Westmar is a rural locality in the Western Downs Region, Queensland, Australia.

Geography 
The Moonie River flows from east to west through the northern part of the locality. The Moonie Highway passes from east to west through the southern part of the locality.

Apart from the Kinkora State Forest on the eastern boundary of the locality, the land is used for agriculture, predominantly on a freehold basis.

History 
Beardmore Provisional School opened on 29 August 1960 at Cooroorah. It was officially opened as Beardmore State School on 29 March 1963. It closed on 5 December 1997. It was on Old Moonie Road (corner of Bendee Road).

Westmar State School opened on 7 March 1962. In 2009, a war memorial was unveiled at the school commemorating those who had died in military conflicts.

Economy 
There are a number of homesteads in the locality, including:

 Bendee
 Bendee West
 Kinkora
 Leumeah
 Tremere
 Woodlands

Education 

Westmar State School is a government primary (Prep-6) school for boys and girls at 18425 Moonie Highway. In 2015, it had an enrolment of 22 students organised into 2 classes with 3 teachers (2 full-time equivalent). In 2018, the school had an enrolment of 41 students with 3 teachers and 5 non-teaching staff (3 full-time equivalent).

There are no secondary schools in or near Westmar. Distance education and boarding schools are the options.

References

Western Downs Region
Localities in Queensland